"Who Would Have Thought" is a song written by Darren Hayes and Guy Chambers, for Hayes' third solo album This Delicate Thing We've Made, released as a limited-edition 7" vinyl and digital download alongside the "Me, Myself and (I)" single release. Hayes added an animated video for the song as a teaser on his official website, as well as his Myspace profile, on 9 April 2007. The single failed to chart due to its ineligibility as a promotional release. The b-side "The Only One" is included on the album This delicate thing we've made.

Track listings
 Promotional CD single
 "Who Would Have Thought" (radio mix) – 3:34

 Digital download
 "Who Would Have Thought" – 4:15
 "Breathless" – 3:19
 "The Only One" – 2:58

 7" vinyl
 "Who Would Have Thought" – 4:15
 "Who Would Have Thought" (live acoustic version) – 3:58

References

2007 singles
Darren Hayes songs
Songs written by Guy Chambers
Songs written by Darren Hayes
2007 songs